Anthocharis euphenoides, the Provence orange tip, is a species of butterfly in the family Pieridae. It is found in the Iberian Peninsula (missing in the southwest and northeast), in the south of France (from the eastern Pyrenees to the Alpes-Maritimes) and in Italy in the Abruzzo. There are a few records from Switzerland (Southern Ticino). Its caterpillars use Biscutella as their food source.

Description in Seitz
A. euphenoides is distinguished in both sexes only  by the colour and markings of the underside of the hindwing. In the females the colour of the apical area of the upperside of forewing is very variable, for there occur also specimens with rather large reddish yellow patch. — ab. lecithosa Tur., hitherto only found in South France, has no orange patch in the male, but, like the female of this form, a sulphur-yellow apical spot. — Larva greenish, with yellow and black dorsal markings
, white lateral stripes and large black dots, head green; in autumn on Biscutella species;
it is a so-called cannibal-caterpillar. Pupa light brown, also green, very strongly incurved (Spuler).

Gallery

References

euphenoides
Butterflies of Europe
Butterflies described in 1869
Taxa named by Otto Staudinger